Louzanne Coetzee (born 18 April 1993) is a South African para-athlete. Coetzee was born blind as a result of a hereditary condition called Leber congenital amaurosis and competes in the T11 disability class, for athletes with the highest level of visual impairment.  In 2017, Coetzee broke the 5000 m (women) world record in her disability class, while in April 2018 she became the first visually impaired athlete to compete at the World University Cross Country Championships in Switzerland.

Coetzee competed at the 2016 Summer Paralympics representing South Africa in the Women's 1500 metres. She was, however, disqualified when her guide, Khotatso Mokone, was deemed to have provided illegal assistance.

In 2021, Coetzee competed at the 2020 Tokyo Paralympics, winning the silver medal in the 1500 m final in a new Africa record of 4:40.96 and the bronze medal in the T12 women's marathon in a new T11 world record time of 3:11:13.

References

External links 
 Profile at Paralympic org

1993 births
Living people
South African female middle-distance runners
South African female marathon runners
Paralympic athletes of South Africa
Sportspeople from Bloemfontein
Athletes (track and field) at the 2016 Summer Paralympics
Athletes (track and field) at the 2020 Summer Paralympics
Medalists at the 2020 Summer Paralympics
Paralympic silver medalists for South Africa
Paralympic bronze medalists for South Africa
Paralympic medalists in athletics (track and field)
20th-century South African women
21st-century South African women